Oxyropsis wrightiana is a species of armored catfish (Loricariidae) native to Brazil, Colombia and Peru where it occurs in the Amazon basin. This species grows to a length of  SL.

Named for Scottish-Canadian zoologist Robert Ramsay (misspelled Ramsey) Wright (1852-1933), “who has contributed more than any one else” to the knowledge of the anatomy of American catfishes".

References
 

Hypoptopomatini
Freshwater fish of Brazil
Freshwater fish of Colombia
Freshwater fish of Peru
Fish of the Amazon basin
Taxa named by Rosa Smith Eigenmann
Taxa named by Carl H. Eigenmann
Fish described in 1889